Tha Kok Daeng is a tambon (subdistrict) of Seka District, in Bueng Kan Province, Thailand. In 2020 it had a total population of 7,144 people.

Geography 
It lies on Thailand Route 222, south of Phon Charoen and north of Kham Ta Kla and southeast of the district capital of Seka.

Administration

Central administration
The tambon is subdivided into 16 administrative villages (muban).

Local administration
The whole area of the subdistrict is covered by the subdistrict administrative organization (SAO) Tha Kok Daeng (องค์การบริหารส่วนตำบลท่ากกแดง).

References

External links
Thaitambon.com on Tha Kok Daeng

Tambon of Bueng Kan province
Populated places in Bueng Kan province
Seka District